Mounir Khairallah (born 2 January 1953 in Mtah-Ezziat, Lebanon) is the current eparch of the Maronite Catholic Eparchy of Batroun since 16 January 2012.

Life

Khairallah was born in Mtah Ezziat. After his primary studies made at the Capuchin Fathers of Abai, he entered in the Minor Seminary of Ghazir. Khairallah studied philosophy and theology at the Pontifical Urbaniana University in Rome.
 
He was ordained a priest on 13 September 1977 for the Maronite Catholic Eparchy of Batroun. After ordination, Khairallah received in Paris a master's degree in pastoral theology and catechetics, a doctorate in practical theology at the Institut Catholique de Paris and a science of religions from the Sorbonne. During his time in France (1979–1984) he worked in the parish of Notre Dame du Liban (1978–1979) and after that in Saint Medard in Paris.
 
Khairallah returned to Lebanon, and was appointed Secretary of the Maronite Patriarchal Synod (1985–1987), animator and professor at the Seminary of Ghazir (1985–1989) and pastor of the churches of Kfarhay and Bouksmaya Jebli (1989–1991).

From 1991 he served as Protosyncellus and pastor of the Saint Etienne Church in Batroun. Khairallah was general secretary of the four sessions of the Synod of the Maronite Church (2003–2006) and has held various positions within the Priestly League (1986–2004). He has taught at Holy Spirit University of Kaslik (1985–2000) and Karm Saddo Seminary (1996–2007).

In addition to Arabic, Khairallah speak French, English, German and Italian and also some classic languages, as Syriac, Greek, Latin and Hebrew.

His election as Eparch of Batroun was confirmed by Pope Benedict XVI on 16 January 2012. He was ordained by Maronite Patriarch of Antioch, Bechara Boutros al-Rahi, OMM, on 25 February of the same year. His co-consecrators were Paul-Emile Saadé, retired bishop of Batroun, and Joseph Mohsen Béchara, Archeparch of Antelias. On February 26, 2012 Khairallah was installed on his office.

References

External links
 http://www.catholic-hierarchy.org/bishop/bkhair.html
 http://www.gcatholic.org/dioceses/diocese/batr0.htm

Living people
1953 births
Lebanese Maronites
21st-century Maronite Catholic bishops
Pontifical Urban University alumni
Institut Catholique de Paris alumni